Mr. Gay Wales - Mr. Hoyw Cymru is a Welsh gay male beauty pageant. It was founded in 2005 as part of the Cardiff Mardi Gras (gay pride) celebrations, but is now an independent contest.

Heats are held at gay venues around the country with the winner of each heat representing that venue or city in the final.

As well as gaining the title Mr. Gay Wales - Mr. Hoyw Cymru, the winner also has the opportunity of representing Wales in the Mr. Gay Europe Contest. In August 2006, Christopher Jones represented Wales in the European competition in Amsterdam, Netherlands.

From 2007, the winner will also compete at international level in the Mr Gay International Contest in Hollywood, United States.

Mr. Gay Wales - Mr. Hoyw Cymru Contest 2006 was held on 2 September in Cardiff, Wales. The winner was Christopher Jones, born on 30 May 1988 in Swansea. He is currently pursuing a career in law.

Mr. Gay Wales - Mr. Hoyw Cymru Final 2006
Cardiff, Wales

See also

 Mt Gay World

External links
 Mr. Gay Wales - Mr. Hoyw Cymru Official Website
 Mr. Gay Europe Official Website
 Mr. Gay International Official Website

LGBT events in Wales
LGBT beauty pageants
Male beauty pageants
2005 establishments in Wales
Recurring events established in 2005
Welsh awards
Mr Gay World